Suchy Las  is a village in Poznań County, Greater Poland Voivodeship, in west-central Poland. It is the seat of the gmina (administrative district) called Gmina Suchy Las.

The village has a population of 4,367. Its name translates as "dry forest".

References

Suchy Las